Mario Hada (born 28 December 1952) is a Bolivian alpine skier. He competed in the men's giant slalom at the 1984 Winter Olympics.

References

1952 births
Living people
Bolivian male alpine skiers
Olympic alpine skiers of Bolivia
Alpine skiers at the 1984 Winter Olympics
Sportspeople from La Paz